The United States competed at the 1968 Winter Olympics in Grenoble, France.

Medalists 

The following U.S. competitors won medals at the games. In the by discipline sections below, medalists' names are bolded. 

| width="78%" align="left" valign="top" |

| width=22% align=left valign=top |

Alpine skiing

Men

Women

Biathlon

Bobsleigh

Cross-country skiing

Figure skating

Individual

Mixed

Ice hockey

Summary

Roster
Coach: Murray Williamson

Medal Round

 Czechoslovakia –  USA 5:1  (1:1, 2:0, 2:0)  
Goalscorers: Suchý, Havel, Jiřík, Hejma, Jiří Holík – Volmar.
Referees: Dahlberg, Wiking (SWE)

  Sweden –  USA 4:3  (0:0, 4:2, 0:1)
Goalscorers: Nilsson, Wickberg, Hedlund, Bengsston – Falkman, Lilyholm, Nanne.
Referees: McEvoy, Kubinec (CAN)

 USSR –  USA 10:2  (6:0, 4:2, 0:0)
Goalscorers: Firsov 3, Blinov 2, Populanov 2, Kuzkin, Staršinov, Mojsejev – Ross, Morrison. 
Referees: Dahlberg (SWE), Kubinec (CAN)

 Canada –  USA 3:2  (1:2, 0:0, 2:0)
Goalscorers: Cadieux 2, Johnston – Pleau, Riutta.
Referees: Snětkov, Seglin (URS)

 USA –  West Germany  8:1  (2:1, 4:0, 2:0)
Goalscorers: Volmar 2, Ross, Morrison, Nanne, Pleau, Cunnoff, P. Hurley – Funk.
Referees: McEvoy (CAN), Seglin (URS)

 East Germany –  USA 4:6  (1:3, 1:1, 2:2)
Goalscorers: Fuchs 2, Karrenbauer 2 – Stordahl 2, P. Hurley 2, Volmar, Lilyholm.
Referees: Kubinec (CAN), Seglin (URS)

 USA –  Finland 1:1  (1:1, 0:0, 0:0)
Goalscorers: Volmar – Wahlsten.
Referees: Kubinec (CAN), Seglin (URS)

Luge

Men

Women

Nordic combined

Ski jumping

Speed skating

Men

Women

References
Official Olympic Reports
 
 Olympic Winter Games 1968, full results by sports-reference.com

Nations at the 1968 Winter Olympics
1968
Oly